Sylvain Grosjean (born 19 September 1990) is a French badminton player. He has won numerous junior title in France, and in 2009 he attracted the international attention by winning the boys' doubles title at the European Junior Championships partnered with Sam Magee of Ireland. In 2011, he also won the men's doubles title at the Dutch International tournament with Baptiste Carême. In 2012, he decided to retire from the French Badminton Association (INSEP), and focused on his studies in physiotherapy.

Achievements

European Junior Championships 
Boys' doubles

BWF International Challenge/Series 
Men's doubles

  BWF International Challenge tournament
  BWF International Series tournament

References 
`

External links 
 

1990 births
Living people
Sportspeople from Lyon
French male badminton players
21st-century French people